Psilothrix viridicoerulea is a species of soft-winged flower beetles belonging to the family Melyridae, subfamily Dasytinae.

Distribution
This beetle is mainly present in most of Europe (Belgium, Netherlands, Denmark, Italy, Spain, Portugal, Greece, Croatia, France, Germany, Ireland, Latvia, Malta, North Macedonia, Slovenia, Sweden and Switzerland) and in the Near East.  There are also additional localized populations in England, mostly on the southern coastline.

Habitat
They are quite common in summer on meadows, pastures, and grasslands, to be seen on a variety of flowers.

Description
The colour of this beautiful insect is brilliant metallic bluish-green. Body is rather long and narrow. Head is slightly longer than wide, with a flat face, large, round eyes and short, green-metallic, hairy antennae, composed by eleven short inwards protruding articles. Pronotum and elytra are thickly, deeply and strongly punctuated and covered of black erect hairs. Elitra are very elongated, square at the base. Legs are long and slender, greenish and  hairy. Pygidium (last male tergite) shows a deep but small V-shaped notch. This species is rather similar to Psilothrix aureola.

Biology
The larvae initially feed on dead insects, then become phytophagous. They bore longitudinal galleries in the stems of some annual weeds (Ferula, Magydaris, Carlina, Cirsium, etc.). Metamorphosis takes place in late winter within. The adults leave the pupal chamber in following spring. This species is often associated with graminaceous grasses.

Gallery

Bibliography
La faune de la France illustrée - Rémy Perrier - Tome VI Coléoptères 2nd part

References

External links
 Listado entomologico
 Entomolane 

Melyridae
Beetles of Europe
Beetles described in 1785